Five and Ten is a 1931 American pre-Code romantic drama film directed by an uncredited Robert Z. Leonard and  starring Marion Davies, Leslie Howard and Irene Rich. Davies plays as an heiress and Howard the man she loves, though he marries someone else. The film was produced by William Randolph Hearst's Cosmopolitan Productions in partnership with Metro-Goldwyn-Mayer. It is based on the 1929 Fannie Hurst novel of the same name.

Synopsis
The wealthy John G. Rarick has made a huge success of a chain of five and ten cent stores and decides to move his family, including his daughter Jennifer, from Kansas City to New York. Jennifer is delighted to move amongst the social elite but faces snobbishness because of her background. She becomes very attracted to a man she encounters, an aspiring architect Berry Rhodes but he is already engaged to another woman who despites Jennifer.

Cast
 Marion Davies as Jennifer Rarick
 Leslie Howard as Berry Rhodes
 Richard Bennett as John G. Rarick
 Irene Rich as Jenny Rarick
 Douglass Montgomery as Avery Rarick
 Mary Duncan as Muriel Preston
 Lee Beranger as Leslie (uncredited)
 Theodore Von Eltz as Ramon (uncredited)
 George Irving as Mr. Brooks (uncredited)
 Halliwell Hobbes as Hopkins (uncredited)
 Charles Giblyn as Dennison (uncredited)
 Henry Armetta as Taxi Driver (uncredited)
 Ruth Selwyn as Midge (uncredited)

References

Bibliography
 Gabrielle, Lara. Captain of Her Soul: The Life of Marion Davies. University of California Press, 2022.
 Pizzitola, Louis. Hearst Over Hollywood: Power, Passion, and Propaganda in the Movies. Columbia University Press, 2002.

External links
 
 
 
 

1930s American films
1930s English-language films
1931 films
1931 romantic drama films
American black-and-white films
American romantic drama films
Films about social class
Films based on American novels
Films based on works by Fannie Hurst
Films directed by Robert Z. Leonard
Films set in New York City
Metro-Goldwyn-Mayer films